David Richman (born May 1, 1978) is an American basketball coach. He is the men's basketball head coach at North Dakota State University, a position he has held since 2015.

Early life and education
Richman was born on May 1, 1978 and grew up in Wahpeton, North Dakota. A 2002 graduate of North Dakota State with a degree in physical education, Richman received a master's degree in sport and recreation management from NDSU in 2005.

Career 
He was an assistant coach with the Bison for 11 years. On April 8, 2014, after Saul Philips left to take the head coaching job at Ohio University, Richman was promoted to head coach of the Bison. Athletic director Gene Taylor said the decision to hire from within was easy. "I couldn't be more excited to sit up here as the new head coach at North Dakota State," Richman said. In his rookie year, he was named Summit League Coach of the Year after leading his team to a regular season championship and NCAA Tournament berth.

Richman and his wife, Stephanie, live in West Fargo, North Dakota with their four daughters.

Head coaching record

*2020 NCAA Tournament cancelled

References

1978 births
Living people
American men's basketball coaches
American men's basketball players
Basketball coaches from North Dakota
Basketball players from North Dakota
College men's basketball head coaches in the United States
Junior college men's basketball coaches in the United States
Junior college men's basketball players in the United States
North Dakota State Bison men's basketball coaches
North Dakota State University alumni
People from Wahpeton, North Dakota